
Golub-Dobrzyń County is a unit of territorial administration and local government (powiat) in Kuyavian-Pomeranian Voivodeship, north-central Poland. It came into being on January 1, 1999, as a result of the Polish local government reforms passed in 1998.

As of 2019 its total population is 45,059, out of which the population of Golub-Dobrzyń is 12,563, that of Kowalewo Pomorskie is 4,130, and the rural population is 28,366.

Neighbouring counties
Golub-Dobrzyń County is bordered by Wąbrzeźno County to the north, Brodnica County to the north-east, Rypin County to the east, Lipno County to the south and Toruń County to the west.

Administrative division
The county is subdivided into six gminas (one urban, one urban-rural and four rural). These are listed in the following table, in descending order of population.

References
   Polish official population figures 2019 

 
Land counties of Kuyavian-Pomeranian Voivodeship